The 1933 Louisiana Tech Bulldogs football team was an American football team that represented the Polytechnic Institute of University of Louisiana (now known as Louisiana Tech University) as a member of the Southern Intercollegiate Athletic Association during the 1933 college football season. In their fourth year under head coach George Bohler, the team compiled a 1–7 record.

Schedule

References

Louisiana Tech
Louisiana Tech Bulldogs football seasons
Louisiana Tech Bulldogs football